The Dongdamen Night Market or Dongdaemun Night Market is a night market in Hualien City, Hualien County, Taiwan. It is the largest night market in the county.

Name
Dongdamen means big east gate in English due to its location at the eastern edge of Hualien City.

History
The area where the night market stands today used to be the area of the old train station. The night market was opened in July 2015. On 3 June 2019, the night market was engulfed in flame, which started about 1 a.m. The fire damaged 660 m2 area of the night market and burned down 32 stalls.

Architecture
The night market was constructed as part of the 6th rezoning area. It spreads over an area of 9 hectares and consists of Futing Night Market for Taiwanese cuisine, street of Taiwanese aborigines cuisine, Zhiqiang Night Market and street of Mainland China cuisine. The night market also features a center plaza, tourist information center, an ecology pond and a lookout tower.

Business
Currently there are 400 vendors operating at the night market.

Transportation
The night market is accessible by bus from Hualien Station of Taiwan Railways.

See also
 List of night markets in Taiwan

References

External links

 

2015 establishments in Taiwan
Buildings and structures completed in 2015
Hualien City
Night markets in Taiwan
Tourist attractions in Hualien County